Borzechowo  is a village in the administrative district of Gmina Zblewo, within Starogard County, Pomeranian Voivodeship, in northern Poland. It is located within the ethnocultural region of Kociewie in the historic region of Pomerania.

The village has a population of 938.

The landmark of Borzechowo is the Saint Anne church.

History

Borzechowo was a royal village of the Polish Crown, administratively located in the Tczew County in the Pomeranian Voivodeship. It was annexed by Prussia in the First Partition of Poland in 1772. Despite the annexation, in the 19th century the village's population remained overwhelmingly Polish. After Poland regained independence in 1918, the village was restored to Poland.

During the German occupation of Poland (World War II), the Germans arrested the seven-member Polish family of Chamier-Gliszczyński, pre-war activists of the Polish minority in Germany, who stayed in the village after fleeing persecution in Germany. They were imprisoned in Starogard Gdański and then murdered in the Szpęgawski Forest along with the owner of the house in which they stayed. Teachers from Borzechowo were among Polish teachers murdered by the Germans on October 20, 1939 in the Szpęgawski Forest as part of the Intelligenzaktion.

References

Borzechowo